Perhamite is a phosphate mineral with the formula Ca3Al7(SiO4)3(PO4)4(OH)3·16.5(H2O). 
It occurs in rare isolated masses in amblygonite-rich pegmatite deposits throughout the world. It was discovered in platy sheed form of 1mm hexagonal crystals. It was first described in 1977 by P.J. Dunn and D.E. Appleman from pegmatite collected from Bell Pit, Newry, Maine. Other specimens have been found in Kapunda, South Australia, in Silver Coin mine near Humboldt County, Nevada and various locations throughout Europe.

Composition
The formula Ca3Al7(SiO4)3(PO4)4(OH)3·16.5(H2O) was determined by measuring its composition with x-ray spectroscopy giving the average amounts of SiO2 to be 13.72%, Al2O3 to be 27.17%, CaO to be 12.81%, P2O5 to be 21.61%, leaving 24.69% to be determined as H2O. The formula's essential elements are Al, Ca, H, O, P and Si with trace amounts of Sr. Common impurities of perhamite include Ti, Fe, Mg, Na, and F.

Physical properties
Perhamite can range in color from white to brown and can be translucent to opaque. Its luster is said to be earthy, but vitreous to pearly along fractures. It occurs as radial discoidal, platy hexagonal crystals, in rough spherules up to 1mm thick. The specific gravity of perhamite is measured at 2.64 with a calculated density of 2.53. It is structurally related to minerals in the crandallite subgroup, namely Iangreyite.

Origin of the name
Perhamite is named after Frank Croydon Perham (born 1934), an American geologist and pegmatite miner of West Paris, Maine who is currently part of the faculty of The Maine Pegmatite Workshop and has over 45 years experience in mining pegmatites.  Frank Perham passed away on 31 January 2023.

See also
List of minerals

References

Aluminium minerals
Phosphate minerals
Trigonal minerals
Minerals in space group 164